Eliot Lietaer (born 15 August 1990 in Kortrijk) is a Belgian former cyclist, who competed as a professional from 2012 to 2022.

Major results

2007
 3rd Tour of Flanders Juniors
2008
 3rd Overall Peace Race Juniors
1st Stage 5
 9th Overall Kroz Istru
1st Stage 3
2009
 6th Grand Prix Criquielion
2011
 1st Ronde van Namen
 1st Overall Trois jours de Cherbourg
1st Stage 1
 2nd Tour de Moselle
 3rd Road race, National Under-23 Road Championships
 6th De Vlaamse Pijl
2012
 5th Kampioenschap van Vlaanderen
 9th Tour de Vendée
2013
 3rd Gooikse Pijl
2014
 1st Stage 2 Boucles de la Mayenne
 8th Overall Tour of Slovenia
2015
 9th Overall Étoile de Bessèges
2016
 6th Overall Tour of Slovenia
 8th Overall Tour of Norway
 9th Overall Settimana Internazionale di Coppi e Bartali
 9th Overall Circuit de la Sarthe
2017
 5th Overall Arctic Race of Norway
 6th Overall Tour des Fjords
 7th Circuito de Getxo
 8th Overall Tour de Wallonie
2018
 9th Classic de l'Ardèche
2019
 7th Overall Tour of Oman
 10th Overall Étoile de Bessèges
2020 
 9th Circuito de Getxo
2021 
 4th Trofeo Calvia

References

External links

1990 births
Living people
Belgian male cyclists
Sportspeople from Kortrijk
Cyclists from West Flanders
21st-century Belgian people